Huddersfield Town's 1918–19 campaign was the last season of wartime football before the end of World War I. Town played in the Midland League and finished in 6th place, as well as 3rd place in Section "C" of the Subsidiary Competition.

Results

Midland Division

Section "C"

Huddersfield Town A.F.C. seasons
Huddersfield Town F.C.